Daša Radosavljević (born 14 June 1996) is a Serbian dancer and beauty pageant titleholder who was crowned the first runner-up of Miss Serbia 2014 and represented her country at the Miss Universe 2015 pageant.

Personal life
Radosavljević was an active dancesport competitor. She took part in the World Sport Dancing Championships when she was eight, competing in the disco dance category. She has multiple national and Balkans titles in this event.

Miss Serbia 2014
Radosavljević was crowned the first runner-up of Miss Serbia 2014 where she was representing the city of Kragujevac. Meanwhile, Marija Ćetković was crowned as Miss Serbia 2014 and represented Serbia at Miss World 2015. According to the rules of Miss Serbia competition, the winner is to represent Serbia at Miss World, while the first runner-up is to represent Serbia at Miss Universe.

Miss Universe 2015
As the winner of Miss Universe Serbia, Radosavljević represented Serbia at Miss Universe 2015 pageant but Unplaced.

References

External links
Miss Serbia Official Website 
Miss Universe Organization Official Website

Living people
Serbian female models
Serbian beauty pageant winners
1996 births
Miss Universe 2015 contestants